Sugiura is a Japanese surname. Notable people with the surname include:

, Japanese film director
, Japanese model, actress and AV idol
, Japanese manga artist
, Japanese graphic designer
, Imperial Japanese Navy admiral
, Japanese-American cancer researcher
, Japanese para-cyclist
, Japanese photographer
, Japanese footballer
, Japanese baseball player
, Japanese actor
, Japanese politician
, Japanese swimmer
, Japanese manga artist
, Japanese manga artist
, Japanese baseball player
, Japanese actor
, Japanese professional wrestler
, Japanese basketball player

Fictional characters
, a character in the manga series YuruYuri
, a character in the anime series Mai-HiME

Japanese-language surnames